Megacera is a genus of beetles in the family Cerambycidae, containing the following species:

 Megacera acuminata Galileo & Martins, 2006
 Megacera praelata Bates, 1866
 Megacera rigidula Bates, 1866
 Megacera vittata Audinet-Serville, 1835

References

Agapanthiini